Red Flag Linux is a Linux distribution developed by Red Flag Software. , the executive president of Red Flag Software is Jia Dong.

Beside specialised solutions, Red Flag Linux had the following products:
 Red Flag Asianux Server 8.0
 Red Flag HA Cluster 7.0
 Red Flag Desktop 10
 Red Flag Desktop 11

The internal structure of Red Flag Linux is very similar to Red Hat Linux, using a similar installer.

History
Red Flag Linux first appeared in August 1999, when it was created by the Institute of Software Research at the Chinese Academy of Sciences. Financial help came from government-owned Shanghai NewMargin Venture Capital. In March 2001, Bloomberg News reported that CCIDNET Investment, a venture capital arm of the Ministry of Industry and Information Technology, had become Red Flag's second largest shareholder.

During a brief standoff with Microsoft in January 2000, in a year-long series of increasing tensions believed to have been tied to Microsoft's perceived mismanagement of its Microsoft Venus venture, Chinese government ministries were ordered to uninstall Windows 2000 from their computers in favor of Red Flag Linux.

In January 2006, Red Flag Linux joined the Open Source Development Labs.

An Equation Group leak from  2017 included tools that targeted Red Flag Linux.

2014 Closure/Restructuring
On 10 February 2014, Red Flag Software terminated all employment contracts and closed down. The direct cause of the closure was cited as being the failure of the Chinese Academy of Sciences' Software Research Institute to pay a 40 million yuan subsidy. The institute cited Red Flag's failure to complete a specific project, and general mismanagement, as reasons for not paying the subsidy.

According to a research manager with IDC in Beijing, its downfall resulted from a lack of brand awareness and sustained investments, coupled with the rise of rivals.

Nanchang Internet cafes
As of 3 December 2008, it has been reported that Internet cafes in Nanchang, since November 2008, have been required to install the Red Flag Linux as a replacement for pirated versions of the popular Microsoft Windows operating system, or switch to legitimate copies of Microsoft Windows. Radio Free Asia (which is funded by the U.S. government) claimed that Chinese internet cafes were being required to switch to Red Flag Linux even if they were using genuine copies of the Windows OS. This system is provided with a non-expiring support contract at the cost of 5000 yuan (~ US$850, February 2014) for all machines in the cafe.

An official spokesperson for Red Flag Linux clarified by stating that the announcement were targeted to the server-side and not the gaming-intensive (and therefore Windows demanding) client-side computers, and that in the original announcement, Microsoft Windows and Red Flag Linux were simply recommended platforms as they have been tested by the Bureau of Culture.

See also

 Canaima (operating system)
 Asianux
 China Software Industry Association
 Inspur
 Nova (operating system)
 Red Star OS
 Software industry in China
 Ubuntu Kylin
 VIT, C.A.

References

External links
 
 
 
 Raising the Red Flag (Linux Journal)
 Harvard Business School study of Red Flag Software

Chinese-language Linux distributions
Discontinued Linux distributions
KDE
State-sponsored Linux distributions
X86-64 Linux distributions
Linux distributions